"A Head Full of Dreams" is a song by British rock band Coldplay from its namesake seventh studio album. It was produced by Rik Simpson and Stargate, being released as the fourth single from the record on 19 August 2016 with an accompanying music video.

Background
The song was recorded by the band during sessions for their seventh studio album in 2014, at their purpose-built studios The Bakery and The Beehive in North London, England, both originally constructed for work on their three previous studio albums. The song "fades in with distantly chiming bells, a synthetic dance pulse, a drum set shuffling complicatedly, and a guitar repeatedly drawing a high, short melody".

Critical reception

The song received generally positive reviews from critics, many of whom compared its sound to that of U2. The Atlantic Spencer Kornhaber called the song's arrangement "cool" and "unusual". Furthermore, he said that the bells, dance pulse, drums, and guitar parts "[drop] out for a bit before the two-minute mark, and you retroactively realized you just experienced the chorus, when Martin sang the title of the song twice to the tune of that guitar line you'd heard earlier. The second verse doesn't end in a chorus, but rather launches into an Arcade Fire-style 'ohh-ohhhh” refrain.'" Janine Schaults of Consequence of Sound said the song "opens with chimes signaling entry into a magical land — like opening the door to Willy Wonka’s gluttonous factory. But, the song wastes no time getting to its generic 'oh oh oh-a-oh' chorus, the kind of thing that a glowing sea of wailers will shout up to the rafters of the stadiums the band visits on tour next year. A bit lazy, one could argue, but as Martin told the Wall Street Journal, he doesn’t want 'anything to get in the way of the mood of the music … you can't translate the melody into words.'"

Adam Silverstein of Digital Spy wrote, "Before Martin's split from Gwyneth and the emotional Ghost Stories that followed, Coldplay were on their way to a poppier place with 2011's Mylo Xyloto. 'A Head Full of Dreams' gladly re-conjures those bright and shiny colours again, while also spinning a guitar line that could have fallen off U2's Joshua Tree. It's the first sign that Martin is ready to move on, joyfully hatching a world where dreams come to life. Welcome back, Chris - we missed you." The Guardian Alexis Petridis said, "The title track adds some pep to the tried-and-tested Coldplay formula – echoing guitars, bombastic piano, massed, stadium-rousing woah-oh vocals – by tying it to a disco pulse". Pitchforks Stuart Berman wrote, "The title track eases us into the album on a glistening groove but halts its momentum for a now-obligatory 'woah oh oh oh' breakdown that sounds like it was focus-grouped into the song." Jon Dolan of Rolling Stone said the song "sounds like U2 and New Order on a joint humanitarian mission". Spin Andrew Unterberger also drew comparison to the work of U2. Tom Breihan of Stereogum said "A Head Full of Dreams" and "Adventure of a Lifetime" "just decorate the kickdrums with spangled pseudo-Afropop guitars and whoa-oh-ohhhh chants". Stereoboard's Graeme Marsh said the album's two opening songs were among its "strongest", with "A Head Full of Dreams" sounding "a little bit latter-day U2".

Music video
A music video for the song was released on 19 August 2016. It was directed by James Marcus Haney and was filmed in Mexico City in April 2016 when the band performed there for their tour. The video shows the band biking around the streets of Mexico City and them performing the song at the Foro Sol. The beginning of the video also features a voice-over of Charlie Chaplin's speech from the 1940 film The Great Dictator.

Live performances
The song was performed on The Late Late Show with James Corden, along with "Adventure of a Lifetime", on 12 November 2015. It was also performed at the X Factor Italy in Milan. The song was the opening song for their A Head Full of Dreams Tour.

Track listing

Credits and personnel
Credits are adapted from A Head Full of Dreams liner notes.

Coldplay
Guy Berryman – bass guitar
Jonny Buckland – electric guitar
Will Champion – drums, drum pad, percussion, backing vocals
Chris Martin – lead vocals, piano, keyboard

Additional musicians
Mikkel S Eriksen – additional instruments, production, mixing
Tor Erik Hermansen – additional instruments, production, mixing
Rik Simpson – additional instruments, backing vocals, mixing

Charts

Certifications

Release history

References

2015 songs
British disco songs
Coldplay songs
Song recordings produced by Rik Simpson
Song recordings produced by Stargate (record producers)
Songs written by Chris Martin
Songs written by Guy Berryman
Songs written by Jonny Buckland
Songs written by Will Champion
2016 singles